Rubicon Group Holding, is a global entertainment production company. RGH has a team of several hundreds of employees in four locations Amman, Jordan, Los Angeles, United States, Manila, Philippines and Dubai, United Arab Emirates designing, directing and producing content including: Feature Films, Television, Games, Applications, Webisode Content, Themed Entertainment Design and Development, IP Acquisition and Licensing and Merchandising.

Lines of business 
Rubicon Group Holding operates in four distinct lines of business, all within the digital media industry. These are:
 RGH Entertainment
 Production and co-production of animated series and full feature movies.
 RGH Themed Entertainment
 Design, production and implementation of a wide variety of interactive and highly immerse themed- entertainment experiences to tourist destinations, real estate development projects, hotels, retail stores. shopping malls, museums and restaurants.
 RGH Education
 Design, production and implementation of new digital content including K1 to 12, professional development, virtual vocational training, game-based educational content products and integrated training simulations for various industries.
 RGH Games
 Design and development of ambitious array of games and applications by award winning, multi-talented game designers for both serious(applied) and casual games.

Strategic partnerships 
In 2010 Rubicon signed a number of strategic partnerships deals with global and regional leaders in the media and communication industries such as Turner Broadcasting and Etisalat. Headlining the new partnership with Turner is an agreement to broadcast Rubicon's own Ben & Izzy and Tareq wa Shireen animated series on Cartoon Network Arabic in the Middle East and North Africa.

The strategic partnership with Etisalat aims at providing the company with edutainment content designed in both English and Arabic aimed at the younger generations.

Rubicon also manages the international licensing and merchandising of its intellectual properties, such as Tareq wa Shireen, the first 2D animated series in created exclusively in Arabic; Ben & Izzy a 3D animated action adventure, Pink Panther and Pals. a 2D animated which is co-produced with MGM Studios airing on Cartoon Network.

Notable intellectual properties 
 Postman Pat: The Movie
 Ben & Izzy
 Pink Panther and Pals
 Tareq wa Shireen
 The Life and Adventures of Santa Claus
 Monsters in My Pocket
 Grover Safari Road Safety

References

External links 
 Official website

Animation studios
Entertainment companies of Jordan
Entertainment companies of the United Arab Emirates
Holding companies of Jordan
Jordanian brands